Kelantan (Kelantanese Malay: Klate) is a state in Malaysia. The capital is Kota Bharu and royal seat is Kubang Kerian. The honorific name of the state is Darul Naim ("The Blissful Abode").
Kelantan is located in the north-eastern corner of the peninsula. Kelantan, which is said to translate as the "Land of Lightning" (see alternate theories below), is an agrarian state with green paddy fields, rustic fishing villages and casuarina-lined beaches. Kelantan is home to some of the most ancient archaeological discoveries in Malaysia, including several prehistoric aboriginal settlements.

Due to Kelantan's relative isolation and largely rural lifestyle, Kelantanese culture differs somewhat from Malay culture in the rest of the peninsula; this is reflected in the cuisine, arts and the unique Kelantanese Malay language, which is unintelligible even for some speakers of standard Malay.

Kelantan is positioned in the north-east of the Malay Peninsula. It is bordered by Narathiwat Province of Thailand to the north, Terengganu to the south-east, Perak to the west and Pahang to the south. To the north-east of Kelantan is the South China Sea.

Etymology 

There are a number of suggestions for the origin of the name Kelantan. One theory proposes that the word Kelantan comes from a modified version of the word gelam hutam, i.e. the Malay word for the cajuput, or swamp tea tree (Melaleuca leucadendron). Other theories claim that the name comes from the Malay word kilatan, "shiny or glittery" or kolam tanah, "clay pool". Kelantan was called Kalantan by the Siamese when it was under their influence.

Another occasionally quoted suggestion is that Kelantan derived originally from the Indian Kolaan Thana or Kolaam Thana, which meant "Land of Kolaan" or "Land of Kolaam", the term kolaan or kolaam referring to the floor paintings or diagrams in the numerous Hindu temples which dotted the land in the very ancient days. This theory supposes that Kolaan Thana or Kolaam Thana gradually became Kelantan to fit in better with the spoken dialect of the local people.

History

Prehistoric 
Kelantan's early history is not very clear, but archaeological evidence shows human settlement in prehistoric times.

Hindu-Buddhist Era 
Early Kelantan had links to the Funan Kingdom, the Khmer Empire, Sri Vijaya, Majapahit and Siam. Around 1411, Raja Kumar, the ruler of Kelantan, became independent of Siam, and Kelantan became an important centre of trade by the end of the 15th century.

Kelantan Sultanate 

In 1499, Kelantan became a vassal state of the Malacca Sultanate. With the fall of Malacca in 1511, Kelantan was divided up and ruled by petty chieftains, paying tribute to Patani, then the supreme Malay Kingdom of the eastern peninsula. By the early 17th century, most of these Kelantan chiefs became subject to Patani. However, the queen of Patani was deposed in 1651 by the raja of Kelantan, starting a period of Kelantanese rule in Patani.

The legendary Cik Siti Wan Kembang was said to have reigned over Kelantan sometime between the 16th and 17th centuries.

Around 1760, Long Yunus, an aristocratic warlord of Patani origin succeeded in unifying the territory of present-day Kelantan and enthroned by his father-in-law Ku Tanang Wangsa, Regent of Terengganu as Yang di-Pertuan Muda or Deputy Ruler of Kelantan. Long Yunus was succeeded in 1795 by his son-in-law Tengku Muhammad Sultan Mansur of Terengganu. The enthronement of Tengku Muhammad by Terengganu was opposed by Long Yunus' sons, thus triggering a war against Terengganu by Long Muhammad, the eldest son of Long Yunus. The pro-Terengganu faction was defeated in 1800 and Long Muhammad ruled Kelantan with the new title of Sultan as Sultan Muhammad I. Nevertheless, the death of childless Long Muhammad triggered another civil war among claimants to the throne. His nephew and son of Long Tan (Temengggong), Long Senik Mulut Merah, triumphed over his uncles and cousins and assumed the throne in 1835 as Sultan Muhammad II.

Sultan Muhammad II leveraged on his loose alliance with Siam to form the modern Kelantan state, centered in his new fort on the eastern bank of the Kelantan river, which became Kota Bharu in 1844.

Unfederated Malay states 

Under the terms of the Anglo-Siamese Treaty of 1909, the Thais relinquished their claims over Kelantan, Terengganu, Kedah and Perlis to the British Empire, and Kelantan thus became one of the Unfederated Malay States with a British Adviser.

Japanese occupation 

Kelantan was where the Japanese first landed during their invasion of Malaya, on 8 December 1941. In 1943, Kelantan was transferred by the Japanese to Thailand and became a province of Thailand. Kelantan reverted to Malaya upon the end of World War 2 in August 1945.

Malayan Union & Federation of Malaya 

Kelantan became part of the Malayan Union in 1946 and then the Federation of Malaya on 1 February 1948, and together with other Malayan states attained independence on 31 August 1957. On 16 September 1963, Kelantan became one of the states of Malaysia.

Geography 
Rising high on the slopes of Gunung Korbu, the second highest peak in Peninsular Malaysia, the Nengiri River flows east to merge first with the Galas, and then with the Lebir — the latter born in the wilds of Taman Negara National Park — before turning decisively northwards and emptying into the shallow waters of the South China Sea. From Kuala Krai the conjoined streams become the Kelantan River (also known as Sungai Kelantan), a broad, mud-coloured stream which dominates the fertile coastal plains and defines the geography of the region. The Kelantan River valley is a fertile rice-bowl, rich in hardwoods and rubber and lush with tropical fruits.

For centuries, Kelantan was all but separated from the rest of the country by the Titiwangsa Mountains, a mountain range running from north to south through the peninsula. Weeks of hard travel were required to reach Kelantan. The "easy way" to Kelantan was to sail around the peninsula, braving the sea and pirates. For this reason Kelantan's history often involves the sea, and boats. Even today, many of its people are very much tied to the sea. A discussion with many coastal residents will confirm that their ancestors, as far back as they know, were "of the sea."

During the 1920s, in the days of British colonial rule, a railway line was built, linking Tumpat on the state's northern coast, through the jungles of upper Kelantan and Pahang and then on to other states. Also, between the 1920s and 1980s, trunk roads were built to link Kelantan with adjacent states. Presently, one can travel by road from the capital city Kuala Lumpur to Kota Bharu using national highway 8 through the mountain range within 8 hours.

Climate 
Kelantan has a tropical climate, with temperatures from 21 to 32 °C and intermittent rain throughout the year. The wet season is the east-coast monsoon season from November to January.

Economy 
Kelantan has a chiefly agrarian economy dominated by rice, rubber and tobacco. Fishing along its 96-kilometre coastline is also an important economic activity. Cottage industries which employ traditional skills in handicraft production such as batik, woodcarving and songket weaving are also evident. Logging activities are active given the vast remaining area of forest. In recent years, tourism, especially to offshore islands, has increased in importance. A few reputable hotels have been established and more modern shopping malls have been opened to cater for urban folks.

Kota Bharu, the capital, is the major urban centre, and there are also plans to open up the southern portion of the state under an ambitious multimillion-dollar development project. The main market at the city centre is a top attraction.

Kelantan had a GDP per capita in 2006 at RM7,985. The State Socioeconomic Report 2017 published on 26 July 2018 reported that Kelantan has a GDP per capita of RM13,593 in 2017, significantly lower than any other state in Malaysia.

Political background 

 See also: *Breakdown of State Seats Representatives elected 2013

A part of the deeply conservative Malay heartlands, Kelantan has been ruled by the Islamic Party of Malaysia (PAS) since 1990. It is currently one of three Malaysian states ruled by PAS after the 2018 elections, the others being Terengganu and Kedah.

Almost all PAS members are Malay Muslims, as are about 95% of Kelantan's population.

The state of Kelantan is almost synonymous with PAS, as Kelantan has been under PAS rule for two lengthy periods. (Neighbouring Terengganu has also been under PAS rule twice, but for short periods each time [1959–1962 and 1999–2004].) The first period of PAS rule in Kelantan began two years after independence, in 1959, and lasted 18 years (1959–1977); the current period is 28 years long and counting (1990- ). In November 1977, a state of emergency in Kelantan was declared by the federal government following a political crisis and street violence. An election took place soon after the emergency which was won by UMNO.

The interval between the two periods of PAS government, when the Barisan Nasional coalition ruled the state, was about 12 years (11 March 1978 to 21 October 1990). In the 1990 General Election, PAS returned with an overwhelming victory, winning all the 39 State and 13 Parliamentary seats. The victory was achieved through the PAS-led coalition, called Angkatan Perpaduan Ummah (APU). In the following General Election in 1995, PAS won again, though with a reduced majority. PAS won big in 1999, due in significant part to Malay anger over the treatment of former Deputy Prime Minister Anwar Ibrahim by then–Prime Minister Mahathir Mohammed and other officials of the national government. However, PAS very nearly lost control of Kelantan, retaining it with only a 1-seat majority, in 2004, when Barisan Nasional, under the new leadership of Abdullah Badawi following Tun Mahathir's retirement, won by a landslide nationally. However, after the 2008 Malaysian general election, PAS regained the two-thirds majority of seats in the state assembly.

For years, PAS has attempted to impose a strict interpretation of Islamic Law on Kelantan. It has succeeded in imposing certain social strictures such as single-sex queues in supermarkets; separate public benches for men and women; and limiting entertainment centres to prohibit "salacious behaviour". Proposals to institute punishments such as amputation of limbs for thievery and execution for blasphemy (collectively known as Hudud Law), however, have been blocked by the national government on constitutional grounds.

One of the most controversial steps PAS has taken in Kelantan is to place tough restrictions or outright bans on the traditional performance of syncretic Malay theatrical forms, such as Wayang Kulit, Mak Yong, Dikir Barat, and Main Puteri. PAS also took action to vanish any sculpture that looked like human or animal, modified versions without the traditional references to Hindu dewa–dewi and traditional Malay hantu (spirits or ghosts) and otherwise in keeping with orthodox Islam are, however, tolerated in certain cases. Also restricted are public performances by women: Aside from Quran recitals, such performances are completely banned if any men are in the audience. While PAS has maintained that these steps were essential to promote Islam and put an end to immoral behaviour among the Muslim population, many consider them an act of defiance against Barisan Nasional's laws — which are more tolerant or laxer, depending on one's viewpoint — and also a major loss to Malay traditional arts.

A 2019 directive from the office of the Sultan prohibited state government buildings from displaying portraits of individuals other than the Sultan, Crown Prince, previous Sultan, and the state's First Minister. This was quickly amended to also allow portraits of the Malaysian King and Queen.

PAS has also ardently defended the practice of child marriage, a practice that been the focus of recent controversy due to recent cases in Kelantan.

Oil royalties

Assignment deed 
On 9 May 1975, an agreement was signed between the Kelantan Chief Minister of the time Datuk Mohamed Nasir, and the Chairman of Petronas, Tengku Razaleigh Hamzah. According to the terms of the agreement, Kelantan was to receive cash payment ('bayaran tunai', the term 'royalties' was not used in the agreement) of 5 percent a year biannually, for any oil found in Kelantan or its coastal areas. In return, Kelantan grants Petronas to exclusive rights to "petroleum whether lying onshore or offshore of Malaysia".

As to the issue whether Kelantan has the right to claim oil royalties from federal government as enumerated in the Assignment Deed. The question arises put so much legal complication and it is trans-border many relevant statues namely Petroleum Development Act 1974, Petroleum Mining Act 1966 and requires legal interpretation on some provisions in Federal Constitution. Being the supreme law of the land, any law or any agreements enacted inconsistent with Federal Constitution is void. Since, Malaysia is a federation of 13 states, the division of powers between two level of governments (central government and state government) are the most important feature in the federal constitution. Relevant with the issue, Article 76 gives powers to two level of governments accordingly set out in Schedule Ninth. In Schedule 9, List I of the Federal Constitution, the following topics are assigned to the Federal Government:

Except as to State rights over permits and licences, the Federal Government has rights over development of mineral resources, mines, mining, minerals and mineral ores, oils and oilfields, petroleum products, safety in mines and oilfields
Gas and gasworks, production and distribution of power and energy
Foreign and extraterritorial jurisdiction
Treaties, agreements and conventions with other countries and all matters which bring the Federation into relations with any other country

As for the state government:
Land: Schedule 9 List II, Para 2(a). Under the Interpretation Acts, 1948 and 1967, Section 3, land includes "the surface of the earth ... all substances therein... all vegetations and other natural products... whether on or below the surface... and land covered by water". The territorial waters of Kelantan will come within the definition of "land covered by water". Territorial waters are defined by Section 4(2) of the Emergency (Essential Powers) Ordinance No 7, 1969. Subject to some exceptions, they refer to three nautical miles.
Revenue from lands: Schedule 10, Part III Para 2.
In addition to the income from land, one notes that in Article 110[3A] there is provision for discretionary payment on such terms and conditions as maybe prescribed by or under federal law of the export duty on "mineral oils" produced in the state. Petroleum comes within the meaning of "mineral oils" under Section 10 of the Petroleum Development Act.

It is clear, from the Schedule, Peninsular Malaysia states has the constitutional right to fees for permits and licences for extraction of any petroleum that is derived from their land and territorial waters. Anything beyond territorial waters, such as on the continental shelf, is entirely in federal hands. However, because exploration of oil and gas is approximately 150 km from Kota Bharu and beyond the territorial water of Kelantan. Relying on that, Emeritus Professor Dr Shad Saleem Faruqi concludes Kelantan has no constitutional right to regulate it and to receive compensation for it. He further argued given the agreement deed to support Kelantan rights over royalties will render as unconstitutional and void under the doctrine of severability (constitutional parts of the law remain even if other parts are unconstitutional), as the Assignment by Kelantan gives to Petronas the ownership of all petroleum "whether lying onshore or offshore of Malaysia" was an overstatement, and Kelantan has no rights to what lies off the shores of the whole of Malaysia. Indeed, it is the rights of federal government guaranteed by constitution that extraterritorial operations are in their hands.

States cannot transfer rights over something they do not own. In the case of Kelantan and any other Peninsular Malaysian state, the Deed should have been worded to refer only to onshore petroleum. Unfortunately for Kelantan, the matter cannot end with the two agreements. There is a supreme Constitution in Malaysia with a federal-state division of legislative and financial powers. The constitutional allocation cannot be altered except by constitutionally permitted procedures and amendments. Even mutual agreements cannot override the constitutional scheme of things because jurisdiction is a matter of law and not of consent or acquiescence.

Current action 
The Kelantan state government is owed between RM850 million and RM1 billion from oil revenue royalties from the central government, according to the Petroleum Act 1974. In 2009, the central government offered 'compensation' or Wang Ehsan, a fraction of the sum actually owed. Discrimination of Kelantan on the matter has led the state government considering action in the International Court of Justice (ICJ).  Support for Kelantan and the local government in defiance of the central government includes the group Kelantan Peoples' Movement Demanding Petroleum Royalties or Gerakan Menuntut Royalti Petroleum Rakyat Kelantan (GMR).

Demographics 

The largely rural state preserves rich Malay traditions such as kite-flying contests, top-spinning contests, and bird singing competitions, and traditional handicrafts such as batik, songket, and silver crafts. The Kelantanese people, regardless of ethnic origin, are proud of their state and its unique local culture and dialect. Kelantan's ethnic composition are 95.7% Malay, 3.4% Chinese, 0.3% Indian and 0.6% Others.

All the ethnicities generally live together harmoniously in Kelantan. For example, members of the Thai community received a permit to build a very large statue of the Buddha without any objection from the Malay community or the PAS government that granted the permit.

Ethnic groups

Malays 

Kelantanese Malay people are the predominant ethnic group in the state. They speak Kelantanese Malay which is distinguished from standard Malay as well as other Malay varieties in Malaysia by its unique grammar, pronunciation and figures of speech.

Kelantanese Malay is somewhat partially intelligible with other Malay dialects.  Whilst the Arabic script called Jawi has less influence in the other parts of Malaysia, it is still widely used in writing and printing the Malay language in Kelantan. Signboards in Kelantan are written in both Jawi and Rumi. To a certain extent, Thai is also used.

95.7% of Kelantan's population are ethnic Malays, and under the Malaysian Constitution, all Malays are Muslims; therefore, Islam is the most influential religion in the state.

To most Malaysians, Kelantan is synonymous with Malays arts and crafts. Kota Bharu, as the state capital, is a popular centre for such pursuits as silat, martial arts, and kertok drumming. Here, too, more than any other place in Malaysia, the traditional pastimes of top-spinning — known as gasing — and the flying of giant, elaborately decorated kites called wau, are still much in evidence.

Siamese 

The minority ethnic Thai inhabitants of Kelantan are mostly centred in an area around the coastal town of Tumpat, site of most of the state's two hundred or so Buddhist temples, and noteworthy for its number of relatively well-off Siamese villages.

The dialect of the Thai language spoken in Kelantan is called Tak Bai, after the southernmost coastal town Tak Bai of Narathiwat Province, just across the Golok River from Malaysia. Tak Bai dialect differs substantially from standard southern Thai and other regional Thai dialects, and it seems certain that the Kelantan Thais are the descendants of an original enclave of Narathiwat settlers established in sparsely populated Malay territory as long as four centuries ago.

Buddhism is also visible in the hundreds of Thai wats, also known as ketik, found throughout the state. Since 1980, the longest statue of a reclining Buddha in Southeast Asia can be found in Wat Photivihan, in Tumpat. This temple is very popular with pilgrims and devotees. The Metta chanting uses the original Pali language or a Thai translation.  About a thousand visitors attend the Wat for such religious celebrations as Tok'katinna, Loy Krathong, Saibat and Songkran.

Chinese 

In Kelantan, the Kelantanese Chinese see themselves as either Cino Kapong (village Chinese) or Cino Bandar (town Chinese). Famous Chinese villages in Kelantan include Kampung Tok'kong (300-year-old temple), Batu Jong, Kampung Jelatok, Kampung Joh, Kampung Temangan, Kampung Mata Ayer, Kampung Tawang, Kampung Balai, and Gua Musang. Descendants of the earlier waves of small-scale migration are known as Oghe Cino kito (our very own Chinese) and the elders are seen as Oghe Kelate beto (true Kelantanese).

Cina Kampung assimilation in Kelantan is manifested as: "Malay behaviour as frontstage and Chinese behaviour as backstage". "Frontstage" or public behaviour includes speaking Kelantanese Malay even when among themselves, adopting Malay-style clothing, and observing certain Malay customs and holidays. "Backstage" or private behaviour includes maintaining certain traditional Chinese beliefs and customs confined only within the home. A pattern which they also associate as Peranakan Chinese, nonetheless they are culturally different in some ways from the Strait-Chinese Peranakan of Malacca, Penang and Singapore or even the Indonesian Peranakans.

The Cina Kampung in Kelantan have native speaker competence in the Kelantanese dialect. It is impossible to tell a Malay from a Chinese here just by listening to their speech in the Kelantanese dialect.

Much of Chinese culture still continues until today; such as Lion Dance and Dragon Dance during the Chinese New Year, temple celebration, eating bakchang (meat dumpling), mooncake, baby fullmoon, pulut kuning, telur merah, eat 'e' (tangyuan), religious celebration including praying Na Tuk Kong. They also cook 'bak hong', 'uang (meatball)' during the wedding ceremony and ' kiam mai' during the funeral.

The village of Kampung Tok'kong in the Kelantan state of Malaysian is well known for a historically significant Chinese Temple known as Seng Choon Kiong. 25 km from Kota Bharu, it is located within a paddy field village with a population of around 500 person. The temple is approximately 300 years old. It is dedicated to the worship of the Goddess Matsu. Every year on the equivalent date to 23 March on the Chinese Calendar, the birthday of Mazu is commemorated with concerts, lion dance, Carrying god ride 'Kheng kiu', 'siam hee' and also wayang kulit show for three days. Chinese and Mazu followers visit the temple to pay homage to Mazu, to offer prayers for health and wealth, as well as for personal safety and security and eat Kampung Tokkong most famous 'Bak hong'.

Unlike the Chinese in other parts of Malaysia, Kelantanese Chinese prefer to conduct their wedding party at home rather than at a restaurant. This reflects their mindset that their presence to celebrate the newly weds is more important than the wedding banquet. And also make it a gathering ceremony to celebrate the angsu 'red/ happiness'. the more guest mean the house owner is more respectable. This is further proven by their generosity of the money gifts from the newly weds. Usually the wedding ceremony begins on Thursday night and proceeds until the next morning because the weekend holiday is Friday in Kelantan. For good luck, the groom has to bring home the bride before 12 noon on the Friday with flowers decorate car.

Most Chinese villagers bury their deceased ones at the local town cemetery. Others cremate the dead at the nearest Wat. If the deceased is old, a three-day funeral ceremony and memorial is conducted, complete with chanting from the monks. But if the deceased is of the younger generation, they are either buried or cremated as soon as possible. They also offers prayers for anniversary for the death. example: for Villager in Kampung Tok'kong also have cemetery known as 'Chiakka sua' located nearby Kampung Tok'kong. and one of the biggest cemetery in kelantan is 'Fu Long Shan' located in nearby kem desa pahlawan.

Indians
Indians are known to be one of the smallest ethnic groups in Kelantan. During the colonial period of the British government, the Indians were brought in to Kelantan to work in rubber estates around Gua Musang and Tanah Merah as labourers.

Orang Asli 

Orang Asli, mostly Temiar, are people who have lived in the forests of Kelantan and Perak for thousands of years. Some of the Temiar maintain traditional beliefs in their natural surroundings and other forms of animist elements. Other Orang Asli ethnic groups that live in Kelantan are Jahais, Bateks and Mendriqs.

Religion 

As of 2010 the population of Kelantan is 95.2% Muslim, 3.8% Buddhist, 0.3% Christian, 0.2% Hindu, 0.5% follower of other religions or non-religious.

Statistics from the 2010 Census indicate that 93.2% of the Chinese population identify as Buddhists, with significant minorities of adherents identifying as Muslims (3.0%), Christians (2.8%) and Chinese folk religions (0.6%). The latter figure may include followers of Taoism. The majority of the Indian population identify as Hindus (76.5%), with a significant minorities of numbers identifying as Muslims (11.6%), Buddhists (6.7%) and Christians (3.7%). The non-Malay bumiputera community are predominantly Muslims (39.8%), with significant minorities identifying as Atheists (30.3%) and Christians (14.3%). All Malays are considered Muslims according to the law.

Politics and government

Administrative divisions

Districts 
Districts in Kelantan are called Jajahans, though actually the direct translation of Tanah Jajahan in Malay to English is 'Occupied Territories'. Kelantan was a divided feudal state, a common situation in the Malay Peninsula, with separate petty local rulers. However, a strong one managed to rise and conquer all these small petty territories. In the end, Kelantan became united under one Sultan. The eleven jajahans, from top to bottom are written in Rumi and Jawi: 

{|class="wikitable" style="margin:1em auto 1em auto; width:50%; text-align:left"
|-
! colspan=5 | Districts (Jajahan) in Kelantan|-
| colspan=5 |

|-
! Number || Colonies (Jajahan) !! Subdivision (Daerah) !! Area (km2) !! Population 
|-
| 1 ||  Kota Bharu(کوتا بهارو) || Badang, Beta, Banggu, Kadok, Kemumin, Kota, Kubang Kerian, Ketereh, Limbat, Panji, Pendek, Peringat, Salor, Sering, Pusat Bandar Kota Bharu ||align="right"|   || align="right"|   
|-
| 2 ||  Pasir Mas(ڤاسير مس) || Rantau Panjang, Kangkong, Pasir Mas, Gual Periok, Chetok, Alor Pasir, Lemal, Bunut Susu, Kubang Sepat, Kubang Gadong ||align="right"|   ||align="right"|   
|-
| 3 ||  Tumpat(تومڤت) || Jal Besar, Pengkalan Kubor, Sungai Pinang, Tumpat, Terbak, Kebakat, Wakaf Bharu || align="right" | ||align="right"|   
|-
| 4 ||  Pasir Puteh(ڤاسير ڤوتيه) || Bukit Jawa, Padang Pak Amat, Limbongan, Jeram, Bukit Awang, Bukit Abal, Gong Datok, Semerak ||align="right"|   ||align="right"|   
|-
| 5 ||  Bachok(باچوق) || Mahligai, Telong, Gunong, Melawi, Tanjung Pauh, Tawang, Bekelam ||align="right"|   ||align="right"|   
|-
| 6 ||  Kuala Krai(کوالا کراي) || Mengkebang, Dabong, Olak Jeram ||align="right"|   ||align="right"|   
|-
| 7 ||  Machang(ماچڠ) || Labok, Ulu Sat, Temangan, Pangkal Meleret, Pulai Chondong, Panyit || align="right" | ||align="right"|   
|-
| 8 ||  Tanah Merah(تانه ميره) || Bukit Panau, Ulu Kusial, Jedok || align="right" | ||align="right"|   
|-
| 9 ||  Jeli(جيلي) || Jeli, Batu Melintang, Kuala Balah || align="right" | ||align="right"|   
|-
| 10 ||  Gua Musang(ڬوا موسڠ) || Galas, Bertam, Chiku || align="right" | ||align="right"|   
|-
| 11  || Lojing(لوجيڠ') || Autonomous sub-district under Gua Musang || align="right" | ||align="right"|  
|-
|}

 Culture 
Kelantan is known as the cradle of Malay culture based on the diverse cultural activities practised by Kelantanese. Among the popular cultural practices are Dikir Barat, Wayang Kulit Kelantan, Wayang Kulit Melayu, Mak Yong, Menora, Main Puteri, Wau Bulan (kite-flying), Gasing (top-spinning), Silat, Tomoi, bird-singing competition and handicrafts. The unique Kelantan culture, Mak Yong is recognized by UNESCO. This ancient theatre form created by Malaysia's Malay communities combines acting, vocal and instrumental music, gestures and elaborate costumes. Specific to the villages of Kelantan in northwest Malaysia, where the tradition originated, Mak Yong is performed mainly as entertainment or for ritual purposes related to healing practices.

Among the handicraft products that are songket, batik, silverware and mengkuang. The Kandis Resource Centre provides information on the Kelantanese wood carving.
 Cuisine 
The Kelantanese cuisine, heavily influenced by Malay cuisine. Kelantanese food makes more use of coconut milk than anywhere else in the country. Curries are richer, and creamier.

 Local specialties 
Apart from consumable items from local and also imported from Thailand. There are dishes which have developed through the rich culture of the Kelantanese themselves, such as:

Colek
Contrary to popular belief, Colek is not just a dipping sauce, but can also refer to a snack eaten with the sauce. Colek comes in various forms, including meaty cholek, colek ayam (chicken), colek perut (cow tripe), colek pelepong (cow or lamb lung; usually fried plain), and also a variety of colek buah (fruits; usually unmatured, thus crunchy and taste sour) such as colek pauh (mango).
The sauce or "the colek" comes in various forms.
• Colek manis (with brown sugar).
• A sweet, sour and very mildly hot version. This colek is different from other chili sauces because colek is very thin and rather sweet. This dipping sauce is used for chicken, and also goes well with shrimp, fish cake, spring roll, sausage, etc.
Budu
Budu is a salted (fermented) anchovy sauce eaten mainly as flavouring with rice, grilled fish and vegetables/salads (ulam). A bit of lime juice, hot chilis and shallots are added on for taste. Also, tempoyak (fermented durian) or fresh durian is added for good measure. Once so combined, the purple-brownish condiment has a blend of salty and sour taste. Sometimes, Budu is used in cookings as part of the ingredient.

Nowadays, other types of fish are also used to create Budu. Famous Budu maker villages are Kg. Tawang, Bachok and Kg. Penambang near Kota Bharu.
Similar sauces are found in the Philippines and Indochina (Vietnam, Cambodia).

 Thai-influenced dishes 

Somtam
Somtam is a green papaya salad with a salty, spicy, and sour taste. The main items in it are young, unripe papaya, soy sauce, groundnuts, fish sauce, lime juice, and chilies. These items are combined in a mortar, pounded with a pestle for few seconds and served. The salty and lime juicy taste is very popular. This light dish is widely available in regions with large numbers of ethnic Thais, such as Tumpat and Siamese wats.

Tom Yum

 Patani 
Historically, Kelantan had a strong relationship with the Pattani Kingdom. Pattani and Kelantan are geopolitically divided but culturally united. Kelantanese and Southern Thais cross the border frequently to visit their relatives and transport goods for small business.

 Tourism 

Among the popular tourist destinations in Kelantan are:

 Siti Khadijah Market – Named after Prophet Muhammad's entrepreneurial wife, it's a fitting name for a market mostly run by women.
 Taman Negara – Located in the Gua Musang Region, Kelantan, near the Pahang border and Terengganu. It is located in the Hantu Hill and Lebir reserve forest.
 Wat Photivihan Sleeping Buddha – This temple is one of the 25 temples found in Tumpat, and is one of the most popular in the country.
 Seng Choon Kiong (Mazu Temple) – approximately 300 years old Temple in Kampung Tok'kong and is a site of pilgrimage for worshippers of Mazu in Malaysia
 Sultan Ismail Petra Silver Jubilee Mosque – This mosque architecture is unique because it combines Chinese and Islamic architecture and resembles a 1,000-year-old Niujie Mosque in Beijing, China.
 Irama Bachok Beach – Located within the Bachok District and is the main tourist spot of Bachok District residents and Kelantan residents in particular.
 Gunung Stong State Park – Home to one of the highest waterfalls in Malaysia, the seven-tiered Jelawang Waterfall.
 Muhammadi Mosque – One of the symbols of splendor in this city that has the hallmarks of graceful gates and golden colors. Al-Muhammadi Mosque name as a tribute to the late Sultan Muhammad IV contribution and service to the state.
 Masjid Al-Ismaili – Mosque located in Bandar Baru Pasir Pekan, Wakaf Baru.
 Pantai Bisikan Bayu (Beach of Whispering Breeze) – also known as Pantai Dalam Rhu, the gentle breeze at the beach produces a hushed sound that, locals say, sounds like a soothing whisper.
 Handicraft Village and Craft Museum – Also known as "Balai Getam Guri", it houses many fine examples of Kelantanese craftsmanship such as traditional embroidery, songket weaving, batik printing, silver work and wood carving.

 Notable Kelantanese 

 Nik Abdul Aziz Nik Mat, Menteri Besar of Kelantan 1990–2013.
 Fatin Zakirah Zain Jalany, rhythmic gymnast.
 P. Uthayakumar, legal advisor of HINDRAF.
 Tengku Razaleigh Hamzah, Member of Parliament for Gua Musang. Former Finance Minister for Malaysia.
 Mustapa Mohamed, Minister in the Prime Minister's Department (Economy), Member of Parliament for Jeli.
 Wee Choo Keong, former Member of Parliament for Wangsa Maju.
 Tan Seng Giaw, former Member of Parliament of Kepong.
 Misha Omar, singer.
 Mohd Khairul Anuar Ramli, professional footballer
 Zang Toi, fashion designer.
 Neelofa, actress.
 Syahmi Sazli, Public figure, Film Maker
 Asif, Public figure
 Yoe Parey, Public figure.
 Ng Yen Yen, former Member of Parliament for Raub, former Minister of Women, Family and Community Development, and former minister for tourism, Malaysia
 Nga Kor Ming, Member of Parliament for Teluk Intan, Perak State Legislative Assembly for Aulong, former Deputy Speaker of Dewan Rakyat
Tengku Maimun Tuan Mat, Chief Justice Of Malaysia
Rozman Jusoh, convicted drug trafficker

 See also 

 Kelantan Royal Mausoleum

 References 

 Further reading 
 https://www.grab.com/my/press/business/grab-widest-network/
 Khadizan bin Abdullah, & Abdul Razak Yaacob. (1974). Pasir Lenggi, a Bateq Negrito resettlement area in Ulu Kelantan''. Pulau Pinang: Social Anthropology Section, School of Comparative Social Sciences, Universití Sains Malaysia.

External links 

 Official site of Kelantan State Government 
 Kelantan Online – E-Commerce & Info Tourism Portal
 Virtual Malaysia Kelantan Page
 Malaysian General Election 2008 candidates for Kelantan
 Malaysia Parliamentary Seats (Dewan Rakyat) from Kelantan
 Kelantan State Assembly Seats (Dewan Undangan Negeri)
 link|date=July 2018 |bot=InternetArchiveBot |fix-attempted=yes}} Launches Saryah Currency)
 Kb City – Peta Lengkap Bandar Kota Bharu
 Tourism Malaysia – Kelantan 

 
States of Malaysia
Peninsular Malaysia
Gulf of Thailand
British Malaya in World War II